Blue Note Revisited is a 2004 Blue Note Records remix-compilation, released on that label.

Track listing
"Oriental Folk Song" (La Funk Mob Remix of Wayne Shorter)
"La Malanga" (Kenny Dope Remix of Bobby Hutcherson)
"Kudu" (Kyoto Jazz Massive Remix of Eddie Henderson)
"Lansanna's Priestess" (DJ Spinna Remix of Donald Byrd)
"Won't You Open Up Your Senses" (4 Hero Remix of Horace Silver)
"Los Alamitos Latinfunklovesong" (Bugz In The Attic Remix of Gene Harris)
"Young Warrior" (Madlib Remix of Bobbi Humphrey)
"Oblighetto" (J Dilla Remix of Brother Jack McDuff)
"The Emperor" (DJ Cam Featuring Erik Truffaz Remix of Donald Byrd)
"Footprints" (DJ Mehdi Dub Remix of Wayne Shorter)
"Song Of Will" (Jazzanova Remix of Eddie Gale)
"A Time To Remember" (Osunlade Remix of Grant Green)
"Caravan" (Matthew Herbert Remix of Michel Petrucciani )
""The New Folk, Pt. 2"" (Towa Tei remix of  Kenny Dorham) (Toshiba version bonus track)

References

2004 remix albums
Hip hop remix albums
Jazz remix albums
Blue Note Records remix albums